This comparison of orbital launch systems lists the attributes of all individual rocket configurations designed to reach orbit. A first list contains rockets that are operational or in development as of 2022; a second list includes all retired rockets. For the simple list of all conventional launcher families, see: Comparison of orbital launchers families. For the list of predominantly solid-fueled orbital launch systems, see: Comparison of solid-fueled orbital launch systems.

Spacecraft propulsion is any method used to accelerate spacecraft and artificial satellites. A conventional solid rocket or a conventional solid-fuel rocket is a rocket with a motor that uses solid propellants (fuel/oxidizer). Orbital launch systems are rockets and other systems capable of placing payloads into or beyond Earth orbit. All current spacecraft use conventional chemical rockets (bipropellant or solid-fuel) for launch, though some have used air-breathing engines on their first stage.

Current rockets 
Orbits legend:

 LEO, low Earth orbit
 SSO or SSPO, near-polar Sun-synchronous orbit
 polar, polar orbit
 MEO, medium Earth orbit
 GTO, geostationary transfer orbit
 GEO, geostationary orbit (direct injection)
 HEO, high Earth orbit
 HCO, heliocentric orbit
 TLI, trans-lunar injection
 TMI, trans-Mars injection

Upcoming rockets

Retired rockets

Launch systems by country 
The following chart shows the number of launch systems developed in each country, and broken down by operational status. Rocket variants are not distinguished; i.e., the Atlas V series is only counted once for all its configurations 401–431, 501–551, 552, and N22.

See also 

 Comparison of orbital launchers families
 Comparison of orbital rocket engines
 Comparison of crewed space vehicles
 Comparison of space station cargo vehicles
 List of space launch system designs
 Reusable launch system
 List of orbital launch systems
 Lists of rockets
 List of sounding rockets
 List of upper stages
 Non-rocket spacelaunch

Notes

References 

Space lists
Technological comparisons